The Florida Gulf Coast Eagles baseball team represents Florida Gulf Coast University in the sport of baseball. The Eagles team competes in the National Collegiate Athletic Association (NCAA) and the ASUN Conference (A-SUN). Florida Gulf Coast has fielded a baseball team since 2003 and, as of 2019, has an all-time record of 599–348–3 (a  winning percentage). The Eagles play in Swanson Stadium in Fort Myers, Florida, which has a capacity of 1,500.

References

External links
 

 
2003 establishments in Florida